The 2021 Horizon League women's basketball tournament was the postseason women's basketball tournament for the 2020–21 season in the Horizon League. The tournament was held February 25–March 9, 2021. Wright State won the tournament and received an automatic invitation to the 2021 NCAA Division I women's basketball tournament.

Seeds
Teams are seeded by record within the conference. Eleven of the twelve teams in the conference will qualify for the tournament, as Detroit Mercy did not complete their season.

Schedule

Bracket

See also
2021 Horizon League men's basketball tournament
Horizon League women's basketball tournament

References 

2020–21 Horizon League women's basketball season
Horizon League women's basketball tournament
Sports in Indianapolis
Horizon League Women's Basketball